Bach in the Subways is a grass-roots movement to bring public attention to classical music, mainly through free concerts in celebration of the birthday of Johann Sebastian Bach (March 21).  First performed as solo concerts in the New York City Subway in 2010 by cellist Dale Henderson, by 2015 events were performed by thousands of musicians in 129 cities in more than 39 countries, and every March since, for Bach's birthday, performances are given by thousands of musicians in hundreds of locations around the world.

Origins
Bach in the Subways was originally conceived and executed as a solo project by cellist Dale Henderson beginning in early 2010, when he began a campaign of frequent performances of the Bach Cello Suites in the New York City Subway. Instead of putting out a tip jar and asking for money from subway passengers, Henderson flipped the usual scenario upside down: he refused donations and offered listeners free souvenir postcards with an iconic image on the front, and the following message on the back:

More people listen to classical music today than ever before. The internet provides instant access to a genre whose global popularity increases yearly. Ironically, the number of Americans who attend live classical music events continues to dwindle. Many feel this trend threatens the future survival of classical music in this country.

The Bach Solo Cello Suites are perfect ambassadors for classical music: their power and beauty unfailingly inspire great appreciation, joy and deep emotion in those who hear them. I perform the Suites in the subways of New York City to sow the seeds for future generations of classical music lovers.

Announcing on the Bach in the Subways Facebook and Twitter pages where and when he would appear on the day of performances, Henderson's work attracted attention from various media and musicians, notably an October 2010 video piece by CNN's Tawanda Scott entitled “He’s playing to save the music,” and an endorsement on Facebook by jazz saxophonist Brandon Marsalis. Henderson continued this intensive campaign of performances, often appearing two to three times a week, throughout 2010, 2011, and the earlier months of 2012, after which he continued to give Bach in the Subways performances but scaled back somewhat in frequency.

Founding of Bach in the Subways Day
On March 10, 2011, Henderson posted the following message on the Bach in the Subways Facebook page:

Musicians: pick any subway station & any time between 12:00 a.m. and 11:59 p.m. on Monday, March 21, play Bach, and when people try to give you money don't take it. Just tell them it's Bach's birthday, and to enjoy the music. This is Bach in the Subways Day! If interested contact me.…

Two cellists, Michael Lunapiena and Eric Edberg, cello professor at the DePauw University School of Music in Indiana, responded to Henderson's call to action and the three of them offered Bach Cello Suites to New York City Subway passengers in various stations throughout the city on March 21 – Bach's 326th birthday.

In March 2012, Henderson again circulated the call to action and attracted the attention of oboist Kristin Olson, whose enthusiasm and energy for the project helped increase interest among musicians. For Bach's 327th birthday 13 musicians in New York joined the effort, and for the first time Henderson had special Bach in the Subways Day cards designed and printed for musicians to distribute during their performances. The cards featured on their front the picture of Bach wearing a party hat which has since come to symbolize the Bach in the Subways movement around the world, and, on the back, a message:

Wednesday, March 21, 2012 is Johann Sebastian Bach’s 327th birthday. To celebrate his life and music, and to sow the seeds for future generations of classical music lovers, musicians will be performing Bach in the Subways in stations throughout New York City throughout the day. We do not want money, but simply ask that you listen and open yourself up to the power of the music.

The day's festivities were covered in The Wall Street Journal, including a multimedia piece by Daniella Zalcman, and in another multimedia piece by New York's Classical Music Radio Station, WQXR-FM featuring performances by baroque cellist John Mark Rozendaal and other Bach in the Subways Day performers.

Bach in the Subways Days 2013–2015
For Bach's 328th birthday in 2013, the number of participating musicians grew to 45 and spread to Boston, Cincinnati, Miami, and Montreal. In New York, a 17-piece chorus organized by Stephen J. Herschkorn and calling themselves "Untersingen: The Bach Edition" roamed the subways offering Bach to straphangers. Henderson again armed musicians with Bach in the Subways Day cards to distribute to audiences while they performed, and New York's WQXR covered the festivities for a second year, this time offering a Google Maps interactive map on their website, with pins detailing all New York performances. This, along with coverage from Time Out New York, led to "Bach hopping' – fans travelled from performance to performance, taking pictures and shooting video.

While beginning work on Bach in the Subways Day 2014, Henderson was approached by Los Angeles-based classical music enthusiast and photographer Jeehyun Lee, who was interested in organizing Bach in the Subways Day in Los Angeles. This was the first time an organizer other than Henderson worked on Bach in the Subways Day, and marked the beginning of an inflection point in the growth of the movement. Bach in the Subways Day 2014 was joined by 77 musicians in 12 cities in 4 countries, including 22 performers organized by Lee in Los Angeles, and a quartet of three cellos and a tuba on a moving subway train in Taipei. It was the first year a Bach in the Subways website offered Google map pins and listings for all the performances.

In the months following Bach in the Subways Day 2014, Henderson was contacted by amateur and professional musicians as well as musical organizations in Seattle, Tokyo, Seoul, Singapore, and cities in Germany, all interested in organizing Bach in the Subways Day in their cities. In addition Henderson and Seattle organizer Rob Solomon, a professional anesthesiologist and amateur pianist and Bach lover, began a global email outreach campaign to invite musicians across the world to join Bach in the Subways Day 2015. On March 21, 2015, Johann Sebastian Bach's 330th birthday, thousands of musicians in 130 cities in 40 countries participated in the fifth Bach in the Subways Day.

Notable Bach in the Subways Day 2015 performances

Bach in the Subways 2016–present
Following the enormous success of Bach in the Subways Day 2015, which fell on a Saturday, it was decided to extend the festival to the days and weekend before or after the birthday, so performers could again participate on the weekend. Additionally the word "Day" was dropped to avoid confusion. Since then, every March countless musicians and organizations in hundreds of cities in over 40 countries around the world join the cause to bring as much live Bach to humanity as possible.

See also
List of Bach festivals
List of early music festivals

References

External links

2010 in American music
Bach festivals
Music festivals established in 2010